Luca Masso (born 17 July 1994) is an Argentine field hockey player. He was part of the Argentine team that won gold in men's field hockey at the 2016 Summer Olympics in Rio de Janeiro. He also holds Belgian nationality.

Masso was born in Brussels, Belgium to an Argentine-born father, Eduardo, and a Belgian mother, Sabrina Merckx. He comes from a family of sportsmen. His father Eduardo Masso is a former tennis player who represented Belgium at the Davis Cup. His maternal grandfather is the Belgian former cycling champion Eddy Merckx, a five-time Tour de France winner. His maternal uncle, Axel Merckx, is an Olympic bronze medalist in cycling for Belgium.

References 

1994 births
Living people
Field hockey players from Brussels
Belgian people of Argentine descent
Argentine people of Belgian descent
Citizens of Argentina through descent
Belgian male field hockey players
Argentine male field hockey players
Olympic field hockey players of Argentina
Field hockey players at the 2016 Summer Olympics
Olympic medalists in field hockey
Medalists at the 2016 Summer Olympics
Olympic gold medalists for Argentina